Nathan Porges (21 December 1848 – 27 August 1924) was a Bohemia and German rabbi.

Biography
Porges was born in Prostějov in Moravia, then part of the Austrian Empire.

He was educated in his native town Prostějov, at the gymnasium of Olomouc, and at the University of Olomouc (Ph.D. 1869) and the Jewish Theological Seminary (rabbi 1869) of Breslau (Wrocław). He became successively rabbi at Nakel (Nakło nad Notecią) (1875), Mannheim (1879), Pilsen (1880), Karlovy Vary (1882), and Leipzig; he began officiating in the last city in 1888.

Porges died in Würzburg.

Literary works 
Porges wrote many articles, essays, and critiques for periodicals including:
 Revue des Études Juives
 Monatsschrift für Geschichte und Wissenschaft des Judenthums
 Zeitschrift für Hebräische Bibliographie
 Centralblatt für Bibliothekswesen

He was the author of:
 Über die Verbalstammbildung in den Semitischen Sprachen, Vienna, 1875
 Bibelkunde und Babelfunde, Leipzig, 1903

References 
 

1848 births
1924 deaths
19th-century German rabbis
20th-century German rabbis
People from Prostějov
Czech rabbis
German people of Czech-Jewish descent
German male writers